The Yekaterinoslav Governorate, also known by Ukrainian common name Katerynoslavshchyna, was a governorate (guberniya; province) of the Russian Empire, with its capital located in Yekaterinoslav (modern-day Dnipro in Ukraine). The governorate covered  of area, and was composed of the inhabitant of 2,113,674 by the census of 1897. The Yekaterinoslav Governorate bordered the Poltava Governorate to the north, the Don Host Oblast to the east, the Sea of Azov to the southeast, the Taurida Governorate to the south, and the Kherson Governorate to the east, and covered the area of the Luhansk, Donetsk, Dnipropetrovsk, and Zaporizhzhia Oblasts of Ukraine.

Location
The government was created in 1802 out of the Yekaterinoslav vice-regency. The governorate bordered to the north with the Kharkov Governorate and Poltava Governorate, to the west and southwest with the Kherson Governorate, to the south with the Taurida Governorate and Sea of Azov, and to the east with Don Host Oblast.

Administrative divisions

The governorate was created in place of Novorossiysk Governorate in 1802 and encompassed a huge area of the southern Ukraine. Officially, the new governorate was created as Ekaterinoslav Governorate in 1802 and subdivided into the following uyezds with centres in:

 Taganrog city (Таганрог) 1802–1887
 Rostov upon Don city 1802–1887

Changes in Russian Empire
 1874, the Mariupol (Марiуполь) uyezd was split off the Aleksandrovsk uyezd.
 1887, Rostov-na-Donu city as well as Taganrog city with its uyezd were transferred back to the Don Host Oblast.

Ukraine
 1918, Taganrog uyezd was transferred once again, but without the Taganrog city and later again returned to the Don Voisko Province. The Ukrainian People's Republic passed the law for the reformation of the Ukrainian administrative division dividing the governorate into five new lands. The law has failed to be implemented and was canceled due to the conservative coup d'état of Pavlo Skoropadsky and establishment of the Ukrainian State. Thus the territory of the governorate was left unchanged and sustained without any major changes until 1919.

South Russia
 1919 Krivyi Rih uyezd was created partially out of the newly annexed lands of the Kherson Governorate.

Soviet Ukraine
 1920 Governorate yielded few territories in favor of the newly created Olexandrivsk Governorate and Donetsk Governorate
 1922 Zaporizhia Governorate was abolished and its territories returned under the subordination of Yekaterinoslav Governorate together with some of Kremenchuk Governorate.
 1923 All Governorates uyezds were reformed into seven okrugs with two of them (Berdiansk and Oleksandriysk okrugs) liquidated on 3 June 1925.
 On 1 August 1925, the Yekaterinoslav Governorate administration was discontinued.

Okrugs
List of okruhas of Ukraine upon the dissolution of the Governorate:
 Yekaterinoslav
 Zaporizhia
 Kryvyi Rih
 Melitopol
 Pavlohrad

Demographics

The governorate's population, a majority of peasants, was 662,000 in 1811, 902,400 in 1851, 1,204,800 in 1863, and 1,792,800 in 1885. From the second half of the 19th century, with the founding of Yuzovka (Donetsk), the governorate became the coal-mining and metallurgical center of the then Ukraine, incorporating the Dnieper Industrial Region and the Donbass (Donets Basin).

Its population increased to 2,113,674 by 1897. The nationalities within the governorate were Ukrainians – 68.9%, Russians – 17.3%, Jews (4.7%), Germans (3.8%), Greeks (2.3%), and Tatars (0.8%). In 1924, the governorate had 3,424,100 (13.6% urban) inhabitants, living in 5,165 settlements, 36 of them being cities and urban-type settlements. The largest social class was that of workers (about 25%).

Principal cities
The data is taken from demoscope.ru. Here is also the most common language composition.

 Yekaterinoslav – 112,839 (1897), (Russian – 47,140, Jewish – 39,979, Ukrainian – 17,787)
 Mariupol – 31,116 (Russian – 19,670, Jewish – 4,710, Ukrainian – 3,125)
 Lugansk – 20,404 (Russian – 13,907, Ukrainian – 3,902, Jewish – 1,449)
 Bakhmut – 19,316 (Ukrainian – 11,928, Russian – 3,659, Jewish – 3,223)
 Aleksandrovsk – 18,849 (Ukrainian – 8,101, Jewish – 5,248, Russian – 4,667)
 Pavlograd 15,775 (Russian – 5,421, Ukrainian – 5,273, Jewish – 4,353)
 Novomoskovsk – 12,883 (Ukrainian – 9,956, Jewish – 1,436, Russian – 1,237)
 Verkhnedneprovsk – 6,501 (Ukrainian – 3,752, Jewish – 2,061, Russian – 739)
 Slavianoserbsk – 3,122 (Russian – 1,607, Ukrainian – 1,342, Jewish – 143)

From the turn of the 19th century until 1887 city of Rostov-na-Donu and all the Taganrog uyezd were part of the governorate, but before the census of 1897 took place they were transferred to the Don oblast. Note that the biggest city of the guberniya was the city of Rostov-na-Donu while Taganrog was not much smaller and the third in size. Here is the data on them:
 Rostov-na-Donu – 119,476 (Russian – 94,673, Jewish – 11,183, Ukrainian – 5,612)
 Taganrog – 51,437 (Russian – 40,899, Ukrainian – 4,676, Jewish – 2,685)

Language 
By the Imperial census of 1897.

Religion
By the Imperial census of 1897.

Governors
General-Governors
 1823–1844 Mikhail Vorontsov

Governors
 1802–1803 Sergei Bekleshov
 1803–1809 Pyotr Berg
 1809–1817 Kirill Gladkiy
 1817–1820 Ivan Kalageorgiy
 1820–1823 Viktor Shemiot
 1823–1824 Trofim Tsalaban
 1824–1828 Alexei Svyechin
 1828–1831 Dmitriy Zakhorzhevskiy
 1831–1832 Otto Frank
 1832–1836 Nikanor Longinov
 1836–1837 Dmitriy Safonov (vice-governor)

Chairmen of the Governorate
Revkoms
 26 October 1917 – ? Emmanuil Kviring
 November 1919 – 1920 Sergei Minin
Ispolkom
 February 1919 – 1920 Vasiliy Averin
 1920 – 1921 Ivan Klymenko
 1921 Stepan Vlasenko
 ? – 1923 Yakov Kuznetsov
 1923 – 1924 Samokhvalov
 February 1925 – August 1925 Ivan Gavrilov

Chekists
Cheka
 1919 Vasyl Valiavko (transferred to Volyn Cheka)
 1919–1920 Aleksandr Alpov (transferred to Mykolaiv Cheka)
Gub-department of GPU
 24 May 1922 – 16 February 1923 Izrail Leplevskiy (transferred to Podolia Cheka)
 1923 P. Onishchenko
 1 September 1924 – 1 September 1925 Semen Dukelsky

Notable people 

Fedir Shchus, born 25 March 1893, (Ukrainian: Федір Щусь, 25 March 1893 – 30 June 1921), also Fyodor Shuss or Feodosiy Shchus, was an Anarchist revolutionary, commander (ataman) in the Revolutionary Insurgent Army of Ukraine of Nestor Makhno.
Viktor Bilash, (Ukrainian: Віктор Федорович Білаш; 1893 – 24 January 1938) was the Anarchist Chief of Staff of the Revolutionary Insurgent Army of Ukraine (RIAU) under Nestor Makhno.

See also
 Yekaterinoslav Viceroyalty

Notes

References

External links

 Yekaterinoslav Guberniya – Historical coat of arms  
 Katerinoslav gubernia – Article in the Encyclopedia of Ukraine

 
Governorates of the Russian Empire
Governorates of Ukraine
19th century in Ukraine
20th century in Ukraine
States and territories established in 1802
States and territories disestablished in 1925
1802 establishments in the Russian Empire
1925 disestablishments in the Soviet Union
1802 establishments in Ukraine
1925 disestablishments in Ukraine